The Nokia C2-02 is mobile telephone handset produced by Nokia. This is one of the first mobile phones released by Nokia that possesses a touchscreen in a "slider" form factor (the other one being Nokia C2-03 body which is a dual-SIM variant).This phone is also known as Nokia C2-02 Touch and Type.

Features
The key feature of this phone is touch and type. It means that the phone has touch screen and alpha-numeric (12 key) keyboard but no navigation or soft keys. Other main features include: a 2.0-megapixel camera, Maps (disputable.) (Customers who never received maps have their phones loaded with Nokia Life Tools application), Bluetooth 2.1 + EDR, Flash Lite 3.0 and MIDP Java 2.1 with additional Java APIs.

Specification sheet

References

External links
http://www.gsmarena.com/nokia_c2_02-3996.php
 Nokia C2-02 Device specifications at Forum Nokia

C2-02
Mobile phones with user-replaceable battery
Slider phones
Mobile phones introduced in 2011